CTheory is a peer-reviewed academic journal published since 1996. It focuses on technology, media theory, and culture, publishing articles, interviews, book reviews and "event-scenes." It is edited by Arthur and Marilouise Kroker. The journal is published by the University of Victoria, BC, Canada.

External links 
  https://web.archive.org/web/20190110151718/http://ctheory.net/ctheory_wp/

Cultural journals
Critical theory
Publications established in 1996
English-language journals
University of Victoria